WSFR (107.7 FM, "Classic Rock 107.7") is a classic rock formatted radio station that plays music from the 1960s, 1970s, and 1980s. It is broadcast from the SummitMedia facility on Chestnut Centre in downtown Louisville, Kentucky, and its city of license is Corydon, Indiana.  It transmits from a broadcast tower near Elizabeth, Indiana west of the Ohio River, which it shares with WAY-FM station WAYK/105.9, and Alpha Media's WGZB/96.5.

History
In 1994, WWSN was a country music station called "The Hawk". Regent Communications moved the WHKW letters from 103.9 to the new station at 107.7. In 1996, the station became known as WSFR and aired a classic rock format.

On October 28, 2011, WSFR relaunched its classic rock format as "107.7 The Eagle", billing themselves as "Louisville Classic Hits".

On July 20, 2012, Cox Radio, Inc. announced the sale of WSFR and 22 other stations to SummitMedia LLC for $66.25 million. The sale was consummated on May 3, 2013.

On March 8, 2021, WSFR shifted their format from a classic hits/classic rock hybrid to classic rock, still under the "107.7 The Eagle" branding, but emphasizing the "Classic Rock" slogan.

On December 20, 2022, WSFR dropped the “Eagle” branding and rebranded as "Classic Rock 107.7".

Previous logos

References

External links

SFR
SFR
Classic rock radio stations in the United States
Radio stations established in 1994
1994 establishments in Kentucky
1994 establishments in Indiana